The men's 200 m Breaststroke event at the 2006 Central American and Caribbean Games occurred on Tuesday, July 18, 2006 at the S.U. Pedro de Heredia Aquatic Complex in Cartagena, Colombia.

Records

Results

Final

Preliminaries

References

Breaststroke, Men's 200 m